Silene hookeri is a species of flowering plant in the family Caryophyllaceae known by the common names Hooker's silene, Hooker's catchfly, Hooker's Indian pink, and Hooker's glandular campion.

It is native to the coastal and inland  mountains of Oregon and northwestern California, where it grows in woodlands and forests in sandy and rocky soils, sometimes on serpentine, up to elevations around 1400 meters.

Description
Silene hookeri is a squat perennial herb producing a decumbent or erect stem up to 20 centimeters long from a woody, branching caudex. It is covered in soft gray curly or crinkly hairs. The leaves are lance-shaped and up to 9 centimeters long near the base of the plant; smaller, narrower leaves occur farther up the stems.

Each flower has a tubular calyx of fused sepals lined with ten veins and covered in whitish hairs. It is open at the tip, revealing five white, pink or purple petals. The petal tips are each divided into usually four lobes, which may be wide and rounded or narrow and fringelike. Small, erect appendages occur at the petal bases.

References

External links
Jepson Manual Treatment
USDA Plants Profile
Flora of North America
Photo gallery

hookeri
Flora of California
Flora of Oregon
Flora of the Klamath Mountains
Natural history of the California Coast Ranges
Flora without expected TNC conservation status